Dayaram Tangade Patil was a Member of Maharashtra Legislative Assembly from 1990 to 1995. He represented Malkapur Vidhansabha Constituency from Bharatiya Janata Party.

References

Buldhana
Members of the Maharashtra Legislative Assembly
Bharatiya Janata Party politicians from Maharashtra